Port Kenyon is an unincorporated community in Humboldt County, California.

A post office operated at Port Kenyon from 1886 to 1899 and from 1903 to 1913. The town was founded by John Gardner Kenyon in 1876. After silting of the Salt River and repeated flooding, the port declined in the 1890s.

See also
 Salt River (California)

References

Unincorporated communities in Humboldt County, California
Unincorporated communities in California